Ustad Ali Maryam was a famous mimar of 19th century Persia.

He is famous for designing three edifices in particular, all in Kashan:

The Borujerdi-ha House (1857)
The Tabatabaei House (1840s)
Timcheh-ye Amin od-Dowleh (1863)

The word "ustad" means master in Persian. The name "Maryam" he picked up when Ustad Ali built a beautiful house for a woman by the name "Maryam" in Kashan.

It is written that Ustad Ali Maryam would build maquette models of the buildings he would build.

The Borujerdi residence alone took 18 years to build. It was built for the bride of the Borujerdi family, who came from the affluent Tabātabāei family, for whom Ustad Ali had built a house some years earlier.

The Timcheh-ye Amin od-Dowleh (built in 1863) was commissioned by Mirza Ali Khan, an influential statesman of the Qajarid court, whose title was "Amin-od-dowleh" (Trusted of the state). It is located in the Kashan Bazaar, where Persian rugs are still sold and traded. Ustad Ali also built a house and caravanserai for Amin al-Dowleh.

See also
Iranian architecture
Traditional Persian residential architecture
List of historical Iranian architects

References

Iranian architects
Architecture in Iran